Brain of Britain is a BBC radio general knowledge quiz, broadcast on BBC Radio 4.

History
It began as a slot in What Do You Know? in 1953. The main part of the show was the "Brain of Britain" quiz itself, originally called "Ask Me Another". There were also several other quizzes on the show, most of which were eventually sidelined to allow "Brain of Britain" a longer running time, though the popular write-in competition "Beat the Brains" is still played as part of Brain of Britain today. It became a programme in its own right in 1967.

It was chaired by Franklin Engelmann until his death in 1972.

Format
Four contestants compete on each programme, in alphabetical order by surname. To begin the competition, the first contestant is asked a question; a correct answer within 10 seconds awards one point and control for the next question. An incorrect answer at any point ends the contestant's turn, and the question is offered to the others in a toss-up via silent buzzer. Regardless of who answers correctly, control then passes to the contestant after the one who initially missed it. If a contestant correctly answers five questions in a row, one bonus point is awarded and control passes to the next contestant. Each contestant is also asked one question based on a sound clip.

The contestant with the most points at the end of the programme wins. If there is a tie for high score, the contestant with the most bonus points (for five-in-a-row and correct answers on questions missed by others) is the winner. If the tied contestants are still level in this respect, the first to answer a toss-up question correctly wins.

The competition is normally split into a series of 12 heats, with the winners of these heats and the four highest scoring runners-up entering the four semi-finals. The winners of these semi-finals make it to the grand final, and the winner of the grand final becomes champion. In the 2015 contest, the fifth highest scoring runner-up qualified after the death of one of the heat winners. In the 2016 contest, five runners-up ended with the same high score. To decide which four went through to the semi-finals, a play-off took place that was not broadcast.

The show also features "Beat The Brains," a segment in which two questions submitted by a listener are read. The submitter wins a book token if the contestants are unable to answer at least one question. The submitter is "awarded" the consolation prize of a round of applause from the audience if both questions are answered correctly. At one point, the prize was a Brain of Britain quiz book, but was replaced by the book token when the book was out of print.

Host
Brain of Britain was hosted by Robert Robinson for most of its life, although during his illness the 2004 series was hosted by Russell Davies. Peter Snow took over the role in 2007, also due to the illness of Robinson, dispensing with Robinson's trademark style of addressing contestants by their honorific and surname (e.g. 'Mr Blenkinsop'), preferring to use their given names. Robinson was reinstated for the autumn 2008 series, and formality returned to the proceedings; Davies hosted the show again in 2009, with the intention that Robinson would again return when his health permitted. Robinson formally retired from the show in 2010, and died in August 2011, and Davies continues as host.

Question creation
Until 2007, all questions were set by one individual, who was present (but silent) during recordings. The host would consult the setter, traditionally known by a pseudonym, to adjudicate when an answer was imprecise. For many years Ian Gillies fulfilled the role, taking the name Mycroft (from Mycroft Holmes, older and wiser brother of Sherlock). After his death in April 2002, the new question setter was Kevin Ashman, who has the distinction of winning both Brain of Britain and Mastermind. He chose to be known as Jorkins, a character in Dickens' David Copperfield. From the 2007 series a team of setters was engaged, as is the practice in most other quiz shows.

Theme music
For much of its life the theme music of Brain of Britain was the opening of the fourth movement of Wolfgang Amadeus Mozart's Eine Kleine Nachtmusik, but in a 'modernised' version by Waldo de los Ríos. This choice was the subject of frequent complaints from classical music fans (with whom the show was popular) and presenter Robert Robinson described it on air as "Mozart plus sacrilege". The theme was changed to a more conventional version in the early 1990s.

Championship
Every three years, the three most recent champions and the highest scoring runner-up among the three recent finals compete for the Brain of Brains title, most recently held in 2018 and won by John Beynon. Every nine years, the three most recent Brain of Brains winners compete for the Top Brain title; Mark Grant was the most recent winner in 2018.

Record score
The record individual score on a programme is 38 by Kevin Ashman (who went on to become six times World Quizzing Champion, also holds the record for the highest ever score on Mastermind, became Brain of Britain question setter and one of the Eggheads) in 1996. The record individual score in a final is 35, achieved by Peter Barlow (1981), Peter Bates (1984) and Kevin Ashman (1996).

Broadcast
Brain of Britain was also broadcast on BBC World Service for many years; in fact, American talk show host David Letterman was a fan of the show, and invited 1993 winner Geoffrey Colton to appear on his talk show. However, some World Service broadcasts had cuts in them to fit the show as well as a news bulletin into the time slot, resulting in some apparent rules irregularities (for example, a contestant would be asked a question and give a correct answer, and then the next question would go to another contestant without it being the first contestant's fifth consecutive correct answer).

Series champions

References

External links
 

BBC Radio 4 programmes
BBC World Service programmes
British radio game shows
1950s British game shows
1960s British game shows
1970s British game shows
1980s British game shows
1990s British game shows
2000s British game shows
2010s British game shows
1953 radio programme debuts
1953 establishments in the United Kingdom